A green building is one that uses less water, optimizes energy efficiency, conserves natural resources, generates less waste and provides healthier spaces for occupants, as compared to a conventional building. The Indian green building council (IGBC) is the leading green building movement in the country. Throughout the building lifecycle, green buildings employ practices that are resource- and environmentally-conscious. The idea of "green buildings" attempts to completely reduce any bad effects while maximizing any beneficial effects a structure has on both its surrounding environment and its human occupants.

Indian Green Building Council

The Indian Green Building Council (IGBC) was formed by the Confederation of Indian Industry (CII) in 2001  The council is based out of the CII-Sohrabji Green Business Centre, Hyderabad which is India's 1st Platinum rated green building and a Net Zero Energy Building. The vision of the council is to enable a ‘Sustainable built environment for all.

IGBC is India's premier body for green building certification and related services. Today, with strong support from various stakeholders, they have achieved the following significant milestones:
 8,669 projects registered with IGBC from various parts of India and abroad, amounting to a total footprint of 
 31 IGBC green building ratings that cover all typologies of projects - residential, commercial, industrial, healthcare, etc.
 1,700+ IGBC Member Organizations comprising developers, corporates, architects, consultants, institutes, government, etc.
 6,132+ qualified IGBC Accredited Green Building Professionals; more than 30,000 stakeholders have been trained by IGBC until date.

IGBC certifies the green projects which are conceptualized, designed, constructed and operated as per IGBC Ratings. Till date, more than 3,088 projects (approx ) have been rated by IGBC. These IGBC-rated projects, as compared to conventional structures, have demonstrated tremendous savings to the extent of up to:
 15,000 MWh of Energy per million sq ft. per annum 
 45,000 KL of Water per million sq ft. per annum 
 Installation of 100 MW of renewable energy in IGBC certified projects 
 Reduced  emissions by 12,000 tons per million sq ft. per annum 
 Diverted 500 tons of construction waste from landfill per million sq ft. 
 
Green projects rated by IGBC fall under one of the following levels (in ascending order): Certified, Silver, Gold and Platinum.

Residential buildings in India:
The residential building sector is one of the largest consumers of electricity in India. Continuous urbanisation and the growth of population result in increasing power consumption in buildings. Thus, while experts express the huge potential for energy conservations in this sector, the belief still predominates among stakeholders that energy-efficient buildings are more expensive than conventional buildings, which adversely affects the “greening” of the building sector. This belief is contested by studies finding evidence for the opposite being the case.

EDGE Program in India 
The IFC, a member of the World Bank Group, and the Confederation of Real Estate Developers' Associations of India (CREDAI), apex body of private real estate developers, have partnered to promote green buildings in the country through IFC's EDGE certification. An MoU was signed in the presence of former Minister for Environment and Forests Prakash Javadekar on November 25, 2014.

BEE certification 
The Indian Bureau of Energy Efficiency (BEE) launched the Energy Conservation Building Code (ECBC). The code is set for energy efficiency standards for design and construction with any building of minimum conditioned area of 1,000 m2 and a connected demand of power of 500 KW or 600 KVA.  The energy performance index of the code is set from 90 kW·h/sqm/year to 200 kW·h/sqm/year where any buildings that fall under the index can be termed as "ECBC Compliant Building"

Moreover, the BEE launched a five-star rating scheme for office buildings operated only in the day time in three climatic zones, composite, hot&dry, warm&humid on 25 February 2009. IGBC rated green buildings are also able to meet or exceed the ECBC compliance. The CII Sohrabji Godrej Green Business Centre is a BEE 5 star-rated building.

The Reserve Bank of India's buildings in Delhi, Bhubaneshwar in Orissa and in Kerala have been star rated.

In Tamil Nadu 11 buildings were star rated by BEE, in the year 2010, including RBI buildings.

Green houses
In Tamil Nadu, the government is planning to build solar-powered green houses for rural poor. It has allotted Rs.1058
crore for construction of 60,000 houses.

In Maharashtra, near Mumbai in the Thane District, Govardhan Eco Village, a community in India, has built buildings with compressed stabilized Earth blocks, Rammed Earth Technique, Cob Houses(ADOBE Bricks) with traditional thatched roofs. These buildings have received a five-star rating from GRIHA, an Indian Nationwide Green Standards for Buildings, a wing of the famous TERI.

Traditional buildings
Traditional buildings were energy efficient because architecture depended on the places. Buildings in the hot and dry regions, had corridors directing the wind to cool naturally. In wet regions, structures using natural light and breeze, were used. Some examples are
 Hawa Mahal - Articulated windows provides cool breeze in a desert area
 Golkonda - Ventilation is designed to let in fresh cool breeze, in spite of summer.
The traditional building practices were utilized in constructing the Dhyanalinga. Mud mortar stabilized with lime, sand, alum and some herbal additives was used.

See also
 Energy Conservation Building Code
 Laurie Baker
 Solar power in India
 Green Building in Bangladesh

References

India
Environment of India
Construction industry of India